The Lohr Railway System or Modalohr System uses special railway wagons of a type known as piggyback wagons, to carry standard road semi-trailers  on the European rail network. They are currently used on the AFF route from France to Italy and Luxembourg to the French border with Spain and vice versa. There are plans to expand this service. They have also been approved for the Channel Tunnel. 
This articulated railway wagon consists of two low-floor decks, resting on a single Y25 jacobs bogie in the middle and on two Y33 bogies on the extreme ends. Using standard bogies resulted in lower maintenance costs compared with the similar rolling highway concept.
The deck between the bogies (trucks) pivots (swings) 30°, allowing the trailers to be loaded from the sides. The cars are built by Lohr Industrie.

See also 
 Kangourou wagon
 Lorry-Rail S.A.
 Piggyback
 Pocket wagon
 Trailer-on-flatcar

References

External links
 Modalohr corporate website
 Modalohr
 A wagon to carry standard semi-trailers throughout Europe

Comparable concepts 
 Environmental Advantage
 Flexiwaggon, corporate website
 Kockums Megaswing 

Freight rolling stock
Intermodal transport